Charlie's Debut Album is the first album of Chinese male singer Zhou Shen which released on November 6, 2017. The album's songs, composer, lyricist and singer won four awards in total after the album released. "Big Fish", the best-known original song from Zhou Shen and "The Rose and the Deer", were also included in this album.

Background and style 
Charlie's Debut Album was a co-creation by Gao Xiaosong (songwriter & Production Supervisor), Yin Yue(lyricist) and Qian Lei (composer). This was also the first time of Yin Yue, a female lyricist in China, to act as album producer. This album took 3 years to complete the whole production, ten original songs in total are included in it. In addition to the digital version released by Taihe Music Group, the physical album was also released by Ocean Butterflies Music Co. Ltd. and Scent Library with the theme of "fragrance of literary and artistic youth".

Other than the main creators mentioned above attended the "Zhou Shen 2017 New Album Music Appreciation Salon", other staff involved in the production of this album also appeared, including Zhou Tianche (Mixer & Mastering Engineer), Ni Hanwen (Recording Engineer & Assistant Mixer), Lost 7 (cover illustrator), Fang Liang (Graphic Designer), Chen Shu (Simplified Chinese Handwriting) and CEO and vice president Ocean Butterflies Music Co. Ltd. of Taihe Music Group.

Track listing 
Tracks in digital version and physical album are same as below:

 玫瑰与小鹿 The Rose and the Deer
 浅浅 Shallow
 哥哥 Brother
 迎刃 Towards the Blade
 蓝色降落伞 Blue Parachute
 风景 Scenery
 妳 You
 白墙 White Wall
 大鱼 Big Fish
 一缕执念 A Wisp of Fascination

Awards

References

Zhou Shen albums
2017 albums